The 2016 Bury Metropolitan Borough Council Election took place on 5 May 2016 to elect members of Bury Metropolitan Borough Council in England. This was on the same day as other local elections.

17 seats were contested. The Labour Party won 10 seats, the Conservatives won 6 seats, and the Liberal Democrats won 1 seat.

After the election, the total composition of the council was as follows:
Labour 32
Conservative 16
Liberal Democrats 3

Election result

Ward results

References

2016 English local elections
2016
2010s in Greater Manchester